The 1874 Huntingdon by-election was fought on 16 March 1874.  The byelection was fought due to the incumbent Conservative MP, John Burgess Karslake, becoming Attorney General for England and Wales. It was retained by the incumbent, who was unopposed.

References

1874 elections in the United Kingdom
1874 in England
19th century in Huntingdonshire
March 1874 events
Politics of Huntingdonshire
By-elections to the Parliament of the United Kingdom in Cambridgeshire constituencies
Unopposed ministerial by-elections to the Parliament of the United Kingdom in English constituencies